Carlini Base, formerly known as Jubany Base, is an Argentine permanent base and scientific research station named after scientist Alejandro Ricardo Carlini (previously it had been named after Argentine naval pilot José Isidro Jubany). It is located on Potter Cove, King George Island, in the South Shetland Islands.

, Carlini is one of 13 research bases in Antarctica operated by Argentina.

History
Potter Cove, in the southwestern region of the King George Island (known as Isla 25 de Mayo in Argentina) in the South Shetland archipelago
was chosen around 1953 to host an Argentine naval station for amphibious aircraft support.

The refuge was established on 21 November 1953, being temporarily called Refugio Potter and then Caleta Potter Naval Station. In the summer campaign of 1953–54 the shelter was inhabited by only three men. It was proposed to name the base after naval aviator Jose Isidro Jubany, killed on duty on 14 September 1948; the station was thus renamed as Teniente Jubany in the course of the 1954–55 campaign.

In the summer campaign of 1957–1958 two groups of scientists working for the Argentine Antarctic Institute conducted geological survey work in the area, collecting petrographic and paleontological samples to study local geological upward movements. Dr. Otto Schneider was head of the first group and Osvaldo C. Schauer, chief of the second.

In 1982 the naval station facilities were transferred to the Argentine Antarctic Institute and the station was upgraded to the status of base, being inaugurated as such on 12 February.

In 1990 the Alfred Wegener Institute of marine research, Germany, began talks with the Argentine National Antarctic Institute, dealing with the installation of on-site laboratories and aquariums with modern equipment for scientific research.

In 1994 the LAJUB laboratory for greenhouse effect research was installed in collaboration with the Institute of Atmospheric Physics (IFA), Italy.

On 5 March 2012, by decree 309/2012 of the Executive, the base was renamed to Base Carlini, after the late researcher Dr. Alejandro Ricardo Carlini, of distinguished trajectory in Antarctic scientific studies.

On 8 December 2013 Metallica performed a concert at the base, under a small specially-built dome and without amplification due to environmental concerns. The show was streamed worldwide.

Description
Since its upgrade to base status in 1982, Carlini's facilities have been continuously improved;  they include: main, emergency, technical staff and personnel houses; weather station; LAJUB Laboratory; Dallmann Laboratory; infirmary; radio station; power plant (both main and auxiliary, just for emergencies); garage and workhouse; freezing chamber; warehouse for supplies; incinerator and compactor for residues; installations for fuel pump, heat generation and fuel filtering and purification; various multiple use buildings; fuel tank array; antenna; heliport; geodetic GPS receiver station and seismography station. This adds to a maximum lodging capacity for 80 people.  it has an average winter population of 29 people.

The base is located next to a colony of more than 16,000 penguins and 650 sea lions. The usual route to reach the base includes a flight from Ushuaia to Marambio Base, and then sailing for a few days.

Carlini enables scientists from different areas to develop advanced research projects in the disciplines of the natural sciences. These tasks increase during the more active summer campaigns. For example, there have been studies on human behavior and its biochemical correlations; ecological aspects of benthic, planktonic and coastal populations; censuses within pinniped colonies (mainly elephant seals and fur seals); physical chemistry and biology of lakes, ponds and other water bodies; tracing of ecotoxicological elements in the Antarctic ecosystem; continuous monitoring of long-term sea level in geology and geophysics operations; coastal ecology and microbiology; effect of UV radiation on marine phytoplankton and bacteria; etc.

Dallmann Laboratory
At the Dallmann Laboratory—a German-Argentine cooperation project—multidisciplinary joint research programs are carried out in the fields of biology; coastal and terrestrial ecology; terrestrial wildlife (mostly elephants and seals); pollution effects on birds and fish populations; oceanography; coastal geology; etc.

The lab has three modules for bedrooms, bathroom and living-dining room, two modules for laboratories and one for the engine room and dive locker. It also has four containers for laboratory and aquarium use donated by Germany.
It is equipped with several scientific instruments and vehicles provided by Germany: lyophilizer, stereo microscopes, freezers, a small hyperbaric chamber for transport, scuba diving equipment, aquariums, a rigid hull boat and a Kässbohrer tracked vehicle.

The Argentine Antarctic Institute, the Netherlands Geosciences Foundation and the Alfred Wegener Institute signed an agreement to provide a biological purification plant ceded by the Netherlands. It consists of a scrubber tank, a treatment and sludge drying plant, as well as facilities and equipment for process control and monitoring, and a set of basic spare parts and fuel reserves.

LACAR Laboratories
The LACAR (Laboratorio Antártico Multidisciplinario Carlini) laboratories—former 'LAJUB' when the station designation was Jubany—are formed by two facilities / buildings: LACAR-Cabildo and LACAR-Catedral.

Of these two buildings, the LACAR-Cabildo is focused on hosting and maintaining different kinds of equipment—belonging to many  projects—for the purposes of data collection; while the LACAR-Catedral holds four laboratories for sample handling and analysis related to various scientific disciplines.

This two buildings, like the rest of the Multidisciplinary Laboratories at the Argentinean permanent Antarctic Stations (LAMBI -at Marambio station-, LABEL -at Belgrano II station-, LABES -at Esperanza station-, LABORC -at Orcadas Station- and LASAN at San Martín station) are managed by the Scientific Coordination area of the Argentinean Antarctic Institute.

Climate

See also
 Argentine Antarctica
 List of Antarctic research stations
 List of Antarctic field camps

References
Notes

Citations

External links 

 Fundación Marambio – Base Carlini 
 Dirección Nacional del Antártico 

Carlini
Outposts of the South Shetland Islands
Populated places established in 1953
Geography of King George Island (South Shetland Islands)
1953 establishments in Antarctica